Ronald Virag (born December 7, 1938) is a French cardiovascular surgeon with a particular interest in andrology (the medicine of masculine health). After training in general and cardiovascular surgery at Paris University, in 1977 Dr. Virag created a multidisciplinary group for studying erectile dysfunction, on which he has been focusing since 1978. In 1981, he founded a private institute in France devoted to clinical study and research on impotence and developed early programs using intracavernosal drugs to treat the condition.

Biography 
Virag was born in 1938 in Metz from Hungarian parents who became French citizens before his birth. His father (1911–1996) was a former professional soccer player, known as [Weiskopf]. After attending the Ecole des Roches and Lycée Janson de Sailly, in Paris, he entered the Faculty of Sciences, then Medicine, of Paris. He was received as an intern, and subsequently as a resident in Parisian Assistance Publique Hospitals. Afterward, he was appointed Chief Resident at the Faculty and specialized in cardiovascular surgery. He created several cardiovascular surgery units in private institutions before taking an interest in male sexual dysfunction caused by vascular diseases. He developed specific techniques to explore penile hemodynamics and designed various original surgical interventions, such as the penis dorsal vein arterialization which was named after him. In 1982, he discovered, almost by chance, that an old medication, papaverine injected directly into the penis was able to provoke a long-lasting erection. Thus, he developed the technique of intracavernous injection used worldwide since 1983 to treat erectile dysfunction. He was appointed as a consultant at Harvard Medical School. He now teaches within the different structures of French and foreign medical societies. He is a permanent member of the French National Academy of Surgery.

On Impotence (now called erectile dysfunction) 
Until the last third of the 20th century, medicine had little interest in treating erectile difficulties. When he was consulted, the urologist received the unfortunate “impotent” between two urinary tract infections, prescribed a male hormone cure which most often came to a sudden end, then sent them back to the psychiatrist. For a number of them, under the influence of Dr. Freud, the sexuality issues were only related to neurosis. However, we knew since the 16th century, under the influence of the Italian anatomists (Varolio, Leonardo da Vinci) that erection is a vascular phenomenon. It was not until the 70s that some pioneers (among them the Czech surgeon Vaclav Michal) designed surgical and then medical techniques to restore vigor to the “impotent”. Among these pioneers, Ronald Virag, still, a young chief resident at the Hospital Broussais, took an interest in the erectile dysfunctions occurring in the patients affected by Leriche’s syndrome (obstruction of the lower part of the aorta which results in limbs claudication and decrease of the erection). Their legs were well treated but not their penises. Urged by their despair, the young researcher will henceforth have a passion for this issue and devote most of his professional life to it. A small international group will then gather, combining the Europeans, more focused on physiology, and the Americans, who developed the penile implant techniques. This group will create a new medical Society which is nowadays: the International Society for Sexual Medicine (ISSM), reach of now over a thousand members.

The intracavernous mini injection 
The papavérine intracavernous injection was a turning point in the history of the treatment of erectile dysfunction. It has been decisive progress in the approach and the treatment of an illness affecting millions of men. Active member, in one of the most renowned units of cardiovascular surgery in Europe, Ronald Virag already developed an intervention aiming at improving the blood flow in the penis. His intervention called “dorsal vein arterialization” is known in the United States as the “Virag’s procedure”. In 1981, during a surgical procedure on the penis, he discovered that an old medication extracted from poppies, and used since the late 19th century to dilate blood vessels, could induce an erection when injected into the penis. After a year of observing the effects of papaverine on volunteers, among which himself, the discovery is being published in the famous medical journal “Lancet”. From then on nothing will ever be the same again, neither in the treatment, as quite rapidly a thousand patients will benefit from it, nor in research as the intracavernous injection will now be the reference and the means of triggering the erection when needed to be studied. Since then, the technique was improved, for the comfort of patients who may now use an automatic injector. Today, “more than ten years after the Viagra outbreak, the intracavernous mini injection remains the most efficient and reliable medical treatment for erectile dysfunction.”

Viagra and Virag 
When the American pharmaceutical company Pfizer realized that a molecule tested against heart failure had positive effects on erection, Ronald Virag was immediately consulted for a first assessment, which launched research on the topic. Afterward, with a Norwegian colleague, he led the first European preliminary study of medicine. In 1999, he was part of the task force appointed by the French Ministry of Health. He was also consulted that same year by the National Ethics Advisory Council.

Prizes and awards 
In 1985, the American Urology Association presented him the John Lattimer prize (a unique fact for a doctor nonspecialized in urology and non-American), awarding a discovery that changed the course of the specialty. The association then made his discovery of the intracavernous injection figure one of the most important discoveries of the century in the urology and andrology fields. In 1997, he was honored by the European Society for Sexual Medicine for the entirety of his works. Brazilian, Portuguese, Spanish, and Greek medical societies honored him as well. He was elected associate member, then a permanent member of the French National Surgery Academy (2012).

Bibliography 
Papavérine et Impuissance (Les Editions du CERI) 1987
L’Homme qui Marche (Table Ronde) 1990
Le Sexe de l’Homme (Albin Michel et Poche) 1997, 2001
La pilule de l’Erection et votre sexualité (Albin Michel) 1998
Histoires de Pénis (Albin Michel) 2003
Les Injections intracaverneuses (John Libbey-Eurotext) 2004
Le Sexe de l’Homme nouvelle edition (Albin Michel) 2011
Ebook : *Erection, the user's guide (Editions Clément) May 2013

References 

French surgeons
Living people
1938 births